Õngu is a village in Hiiumaa Parish, Hiiu County in northwestern Estonia.  

It was the first village in Estonia to receive T1 Internet access.

Õngu River flows through the village.

References

Villages in Hiiu County